Police watercraft are boats or other vessels that are used by police agencies to patrol bodies of water. They are usually employed on major rivers, in enclosed harbors near cities or in places where a stronger presence than that offered by the harbormaster or coast guard is needed.

Police boats sometimes have high-performance engines in order to catch up with fleeing fugitives on the water. They have been used since the beginning of the 20th century.

Types of police boats

 Patrol boat
 Motorboat
 Airboat
 Rigid-hulled inflatable boat

Gallery of police boats

See also 
Coast guard
Fire boat
Harbourmaster
Water police

References

External links

Boat types
Watercraft